Iliac can refer to one of the following: 

 Iliac artery
 Ilium (bone)
 Iliac vein
 Iliac fossa
 Iliac fascia